Expoland, located in Suita, Japan was opened as the amusement zone at the International Exposition in 1970 (Expo '70) in Osaka and thrived for over 30 years as an amusement park. There were more than 40 rides and attractions (including 8 roller coasters) and 19 restaurants and shops. The park was permanently closed in 2009.

On May 5, 2007, Fujin Raijin II, the park's TOGO stand-up coaster, derailed, killing Yoshino Kogawara, a 19-year-old university student from Higashiomi, Shiga and injuring an additional nineteen guests. Initial reports said that forty people were injured, with thirty-one being taken to hospital.  An investigation revealed that the ride derailed due to a broken axle, of which none had been replaced for fifteen years.  Following this accident, similar coasters at other Japanese parks were voluntarily shut down and inspected to see if they could also have the same axle flaw.  Expoland was cited by authorities for faulty maintenance when similar axle cracks were found on a second train a month later.

The park reopened after the accident but closed again on December 9, 2007, citing a lack of attendance. On February 9, 2009, its owners decided to close the park down permanently.

References

External links
Archive of Official website

Tourist attractions in Osaka Prefecture
2007 in Japan
Buildings and structures in Osaka Prefecture
Defunct amusement parks in Japan
Expo '70
1970 establishments in Japan
2009 disestablishments in Japan
Suita
World's fair sites in Osaka
Amusement parks opened in 1970
Amusement parks closed in 2009